Cyril Stephanov Kurtev (18 June 1891 in Dripchevo, Ottoman Empire, today Bulgaria – 9 March 1971 in Kuklen, Plovdiv Province, Bulgaria) was a Bulgarian Greek Catholic bishop.

Biography
Bishop Cyril Kurtev was born into an Orthodox family in the Dripchevo village (today in Haskovo Province). In 1901 he began his studies at the elementary school at a monastery in the nearby village Mustrak, the former monastery known throughout Eastern Thrace as Monk Panteleimon.

Kurtev continued his studies in Karaağaç, Edirne at the Assumptionists college fathers, where he studied until 1908. To prepare for the priesthood, Kurtev was sent to the major seminary of Saint Leo in Constantinople. On 8 September 1913 he was ordained a deacon by Archbishop Michael Mirov. On 1 June 1914 Kurtev was ordained a priest by Bishop Michael Petkov in the Cathedral of Saint Elias in Edirne. In the spring of 1924 he became assistant of Josaphat Kozarov, administrator of Greek Catholics in Bulgaria. On 23 September 1925 Mirov was appointed Acting Administrator of Bulgarian Exarchate of the Greek Catholics. On 25 July 1926 by Pope Pius XII he was appointed bishop, and the ordination took place on December 5, 1925 at the Cathedral of Saint Clement in Rome. As a symbol of his future ministry Kurtev took a new name Cyril, in honor of Saint Cyril of Thessalonica. On 30 May 1941 he unexpectedly resigned, and was replaced by Ivan Garufalov whom he personally ordained bishop. Garufalov's death of forces Cyril return to his post in 1951. At this time Kurtev remains the only Catholic bishop in Communist Bulgaria, he had to take care not only of the Greek-Catholics, and the Catholics of Latin rite of the Nikopol and Sophia-Plovdiv dioceses. In the 1960s, Bishop Kurtev took part in the II Vatican Council. On 7 March 1971 in the city of Kuklen, during the liturgy the Bishop suffered a heart attack. He died two days later.

External links
 Kae-bg.org
 Catholic-hierarchy.org
 Епископ Кирил Куртев

Bulgarian Eastern Catholic bishops
Converts to Eastern Catholicism from Eastern Orthodoxy
Former Bulgarian Orthodox Christians
1891 births
1971 deaths
People from Haskovo Province
Eastern Catholic bishops in Bulgaria